David W. Bargeron (born September 6, 1942) is an American trombonist and tuba player who was a member of the jazz-rock group Blood, Sweat & Tears.

Career 
Bargeron was lead trombonist with Clark Terry's Big Band and played bass trombone and tuba with Doc Severinsen's Band between 1968 and 1970. He joined Blood, Sweat, and Tears in 1970 after Jerry Hyman departed and first appeared on the album B, S & T; 4. With this group, he recorded the jazz-rock solo on the tuba in "And When I Die/One Room Country Shack" on the album Live and Improvised His recording credits with BS&T include eleven albums. A break in their schedule allowed him to join the Gil Evans Orchestra in 1972.

Bargeron became a freelance musician after leaving Blood, Sweat, and Tears. He has recorded with Billy Joel, Paul Simon, Mick Jagger, James Taylor, Eric Clapton, David Sanborn, Carla Bley, and Pat Metheny. He has performed with the George Gruntz Concert Jazz Band from Switzerland, the George Russell Living Time Orchestra, and was a long-time member of Jaco Pastorius's Word of Mouth Band. He has recorded and toured with Tuba Tuba, a jazz tuba band which includes Michel Godard, Luciano Biondini, and Kenwood Dennard. He is a member of Howard Johnson's Gravity, a six-tuba group that has been together since 1968. Bargeron has released several albums as a soloist and in collaboration.

Discography

As leader
 Barge Burns...Slide Flies (Mapleshade, 1995)
 Tuba Tuba (Enja, 2001)

As sideman
With Blood, Sweat & Tears
 B, S & T 4 (Columbia, 1971)
 New Blood (Columbia, 1972)
 No Sweat (Columbia, 1973)
 Mirror Image (Columbia, 1974)
 New City (Columbia, 1975)
 In Concert (CBS, 1976)
 More Than Ever (Columbia, 1976)
 Brand New Day (ABC, 1977)

With Gil Evans
 Live at the Public Theater (New York 1980) (Trio, 1981)
 Bud and Bird (Electric Bird, 1987)
 Farewell (Electric Bird, 1988)

With George Gruntz
 Theatre (ECM, 1984)
 First Prize (Enja, 1989)
 Blues 'N Dues Et Cetera (Enja, 1991)
 Beyond Another Wall (TCB, 1994)
 Liebermann Live at Jazz Fest Berlin (TCB, 1999)
 Merryteria (TCB, 1999)
 Expo Triangle (MGB, 2000)
 Global Excellence (TCB, 2001)
 Tiger by the Tail (TCB, 2006)
 Pourquoi Pas? Why Not? (TCB, 2008)
 Matterhorn Matters (MGB, 2010)
 News Reel Matters (MGB, 2013)

With Howard Johnson
 Gravity!!! (Verve/Motor Music, 1996)
 Right Now! (Verve/Motor Music, 1997)
 Testimony (Tuscarora, 2017)

With Bob Mintzer
 Papa Lips (CBS/Sony, 1983)
 Incredible Journey (DMP, 1985)
 Spectrum (DMP, 1988)
 Urban Contours (DMP, 1989)
 Art of the Big Band (DMP, 1991)
 Departure (DMP, 1993)
 Live at the Berlin Jazz Festival (Basic, 1996)

With Jaco Pastorius
 Word of Mouth (Warner Bros., 1981)
 Twins I Aurex Jazz Festival '82 (Warner Bros., 1982)
 Twins II Aurex Jazz Festival '82 (Warner Bros., 1982)
 Invitation (Warner Bros., 1983)
 The Birthday Concert (Warner Bros., 1995)
 Twins I & II:  Live in Japan 1982 (Warner Bros., 1999)
 Then & Now (Rhino/Warner, 2016)
 Truth, Liberty & Soul (Resonance, 2017)

With Steve Tyrell
 This Guy's in Love (Columbia, 2003)
 The Disney Standards (Walt Disney, 2006)
 Back to Bacharach (Koch, 2008)

With others
 Rabih Abou-Khalil, The Cactus of Knowledge (Enja, 2001)
 Ray Anderson, Big Band Record (Gramavision, 1994)
 Ashford & Simpson, A Musical Affair (Warner Bros., 1980)
 B. B. & Q. Band, All Night Long (Capitol, 1982)
 Bananarama, Please Yourself (London, 1993)
 Carla Bley, Looking for America (WATT Works/ECM, 2003)
 Randy Brecker, Into the Sun (Sweeca, 1996)
 Jonatha Brooke, My Mother Has 4 Noses (Bad Dog, 2014)
 Hiram Bullock, Give It What U Got (1987)
 Michel Camilo, One More Once (Columbia, 1994)
 Michel Camilo, Caribe (Calle 54, 2009)
 Tom Chapin, Zag Zig (Sony Wonder 1994)
 Kristin Chenoweth, Let Yourself Go (Sony Classical, 2001)
 Eric Clapton, August (Warner Bros., 1986)
 David Clayton-Thomas, David Clayton-Thomas (Columbia, 1972)
 Joe Cocker, Civilized Man (Capitol, 1984)
 Miles Davis & Quincy Jones, Live at Montreux (Warner Bros., 1993)
 Charles Earland, Coming to You Live (Columbia, 1980)
 Charles Earland, Earland's Street Themes (Columbia, 2012)
 Peter Erskine, Motion Poet (Denon, 1988)
 Aydin Esen, Anadolu (Columbia, 1992)
 Bill Evans-George Russell Orchestra, Living Time (Columbia, 1972)
 Donald Fagen, The Nightfly (Warner Bros., 1982)
 Thomas Fersen, Le Jour Du Poisson (Tot Ou Tard 1997)
 Michael Franks, Skin Dive (Warner Bros, 1985)
 Michael Gibbs, Big Music (Venture, 1988)
 Michael Gibbs, Nonsequence (Provocateur, 2001)
 Johnny Griffin, Dance of Passion (Antilles, 1993)
 Carol Hall, If I Be Your Lady (Elektra, 1971)
 Terumasa Hino, City Connection (Flying Disk 1979)
 James Ingram, Never Felt So Good (Qwest, 1986)
 Paul Jabara, De La Noche: The True Story (Warner Bros., 1986)
 Bob James, Three (CTI, 1976)
 Bob James, Touchdown (Tappan Zee/Columbia, 1978)
 Billy Joel, The Bridge (Columbia, 1986)
 Chaka Khan, Naughty (Warner Bros., 1980)
 Toshinobu Kubota, Neptune (Sony 1992)
 Pete Levin, Party in the Basement (Gramavision, 1990)
 Lyle Mays, Street Dreams (Geffen, 1988)
 Susan McKeown, Bushes & Briars (Alula 1998)
 Pat Metheny, Secret Story (Geffen, 1992)
 Othello Molineaux, It's About Time (Big World Music, 1993)
 Michael Bolton, All That Matters (1997)
 James Moody, Young at Heart (Warner Bros., 1996)
 Max Morath, A Tribute to Bert Williams (Vanguard, 1996)
 Gerry Mulligan, Re-birth of the Cool (GRP, 1992)
 Aaron Neville, Nature Boy: The Standards Album (Verve, 2003)
 Claude Nougaro, Nougayork (WEA, 1987)
 Robert Palmer, Ridin' High (EMI 1992)
 Lenny Pickett, Lenny Pickett with the Borneo Horns (Carthage, 1987)
 Natalie Cole, Snowfall on the Sahara (1999)
 Sheryl Lee Ralph, In the Evening (New York Music Co., 1984)
 Raw Stylus, Pushing Against the Flow (Geffen, Giant Step 1995)
 The Roches, A Dove (MCA, 1992)
 George Russell, It's About Time 1996 (Label Bleu, 2016)
 George Russell, The 80th Birthday Concert (Concept Publishing, 2005)
 Philippe Saisse, Halfway 'Til Dawn (GRP, 1999)
 Henri Salvador, Monsieur Henri (TriStar Music 1994)
 Mark Sholtez, Real Street (Universal/Verve, 2006)
 Paul Simon, Graceland (Warner Bros, 1986)
 Paul Simon, The Rhythm of the Saints (Warner Bros., 1990)
 Phoebe Snow, Something Real (Elektra, 1989)
 Livingston Taylor, Bicycle (1996)
 Spyro Gyra, City Kids (MCA, 1983)
 Candi Staton, Candi Staton (Warner Bros., 1980)
 James Taylor, New Moon Shine (Columbia, 1991)
 B. J. Thomas, Longhorns & Londonbridges (Paramount, 1974)
 Teri Thornton, I'll Be Easy to Find (Verve, 1999)
 Luther Vandross, Forever, for Always, for Love (Epic, 1982)
 Paul Whiteman, Maurice Peress, Ivan Davis, Dick Hyman, The Birth of Rhapsody in Blue (Musical Heritage Society, 1987)
 Ernie Wilkins, Hard Mother Blues (Mainstream, 1970)
 Ernie Wilkins, Screaming Mothers (Mainstream, 1974)
 Larry Willis, Inner Crisis (Groove Merchant, 1973)

References

External links
 Official website  

1942 births
Living people
Musicians from New York City
People from Athol, Massachusetts
Jazz musicians from Massachusetts
Jazz musicians from New York (state)
21st-century American male musicians
21st-century tubists
American jazz trombonists
American jazz tubists
American male jazz musicians
Male trombonists
Blood, Sweat & Tears members
Mapleshade Records artists
Enja Records artists